Cuala GAA club (or Cuala GAC) is a Gaelic Athletic Association club based in Dalkey in the south of County Dublin, Ireland. It fields teams in Dublin GAA competitions. Cuala is primarily based in a sports and social centre in Dalkey, and also has playing facilities in Glenageary, Meadow Vale/Clonkeen Park, Shankill and Sallynoggin.

The club name derives from Cualu or Cuala, an ancient kingdom of Ireland that stretched roughly from the Liffey to Arklow.

History
The club won consecutive All-Ireland Senior Club Hurling Championships in 2017 and 2018.

The club replaced the Davy Group of stockbrokers as its jersey sponsor with biotech company Amgen in 2019 as part of a deal that attracted notice outside the area. Huawei sponsors the hurlers.

Notable players
 Mick Holden, represented Dublin at all levels both hurling and football, 1983 Senior All-Ireland football winner
 Michael Fitzsimons, member of the Dublin teams that won the All-Ireland Championship in 2011, 2013, 2015, 2016, 2017, 2018, 2019 and 2020
 Con O'Callaghan, member of the Dublin teams that won the All-Ireland Championship in 2017, 2018 2019 and 2020
 David Treacy Dublin senior hurler
 Cian O'Callaghan Dublin senior hurler
 Oisín Gough

Honours

Hurling
 All-Ireland Senior Club Hurling Championship Winners 2017 2018
 Leinster Senior Club Hurling Championship Winners 2016 2017
 Dublin Senior Hurling Championship Winners – 1989, 1991, 1994, 2015, 2016, 2017, 2019, 2020
  Dublin Senior Hurling League Winners 1976, 1980, 1991, 2015, 2016, 2019,2020
 Dublin Junior Hurling Championship Winners 1977, 1985, 1993 
 Dublin Junior B Hurling Championship 2018
 Dublin Minor B Hurling Championship Winners 2015
 Boland Cup Winners 1983 
 Dublin Under 21 Hurling Championship Winners 2009

Camogie 
 Dublin Camogie Division 4 League Winners 2017
 Dublin Camogie Division 5 League Winners 2016
 Dublin Camogie Division 7 League Winners 2016
 Dublin Camogie Division 5 Championship Winners 2015
 All Ireland Féile Divisional Finalist 2015

Ladies' Gaelic Football 
 Dublin Junior D Ladies Football Championship Winners 2004
 Dublin Junior C Ladies Football Championship Winners 2006
 Dublin Div 2 Feile Ladies Football Championship [Under 14s] Winners 2007
 Dublin Div 4 League Ladies Football Winners 2010
 Dublin Group B Ladies Football Championship Winners 2010
 Dublin Junior Ladies Football Championship 2017
 Leinster Junior Ladies Football Championship 2017

Men's Gaelic Football 
 Dublin Under 21 Football Championship Winners 1976, 2009
 Dublin Under 21 Football League Winners 1976
 Dublin Junior Football Championship Winners 1978
 Dublin Junior B Football Championship: Winners 2008
 Dublin Intermediate Football Championship Winners 1981, 2012
 Loving Cup Winners 1981
 Dublin AFL Div. 3 Winners 1985
 Dublin AFL Div. 4 Winners 2002
 Dublin AFL Div. 8 Winners 2002, 2016
 Dublin AFL Div. 10S Winners 2010
 Dublin Minor Football Championship Winners 2006, 2013
 Leinster Minor Club Football Championship Winners 2006
 Dublin Senior B Football Championship Winners 2015,2020,2021
  Dublin Feile Div 4 Football Winners 2017

References

External links
 

Dalkey
Gaelic games clubs in Dún Laoghaire–Rathdown
Gaelic football clubs in Dún Laoghaire–Rathdown
Hurling clubs in Dún Laoghaire–Rathdown
Camogie clubs in County Dublin